The Dublin Irish Festival is an annual music and cultural festival held in Dublin, Ohio. Activities include Irish and other Celtic music, genealogy, food and drink, dance, cultural exhibits, games, sports, arts and crafts, and children's activities. The Dublin Irish Festival Academy offers a variety of classes led by DIF performers highlighting Irish music and culture.

The event, produced and supported by the City of Dublin, is the largest 3-day Irish Festival on the planet. The Columbus Feis, an internationally renowned Irish dance competition, occurs every year at the same time as the Irish Festival. The 2021 Dublin Irish Festival took place on August 6–8. This festival will mark  years. The main attractions play at stages located throughout Coffman Park, including the Guinness Celtic Rock Stage, Ohio State Wexner Medical Center Dublin Stage, The Memorial Tournament Trinity Stage, Giant Eagle Irish Thunder Stage, G & J Pepsi Shamrock Stage, Celtic Music House, Wendy's Wee Folk Stage and the Cardinal Health Ceili Dance Stage.

History
The Irish Festival began in 1988 with a handful of dancers and a band known as the Irish Brigade. At that time, it took place on a tennis court. In 1992, the City of Dublin became the main sponsor of the Festival. In 1993, attendance surpassed 10,000. On the Irish Festival's 10th anniversary, in 1997, attendees set the Guinness Book of World Records' record for the Largest Irish Jig. On the Irish Festival's 15th anniversary, in 2002, attendance reached 70,000. 2002 also marked Flogging Molly's debut concert at the Irish Festival. In 2009, attendance exceeded 100,000 for the first time. The world renowned Richens-Timm Academy of Irish Dance is the only entertainer who has performed every year at the festival since its inception in 1988 and is festival favorite among many attendees.

The 2020 festival was canceled due to the COVID-19 pandemic; the 35th was deferred to 2022.

Activities

Wee Folk AreaThe Wendy's Wee Folk area features free activities, entertainment and crafts. Activities include magicians, storytellers, and Irish dance lessons. Another feature are vendors unique to the Wee Folk area. Children will have the opportunity to make a candy straw or have their faces painted. There are also Irish themed contests for reddest hair, greenest eyes and most freckles. Children will have access to the Pot O'Gold Playland, a game area with inflatable rides, Gaelic games, and a climbing wall.Dublin Irish Festival 5K and Kids Fun Run/WalkEvery year the Irish Festival has a 5K in which the contestants wear green. As of 2012, the Irish Festival will feature a kids run in addition to the normal 5K. Cultural ActivitiesThe Cultural Activities will allow participants to visit the past as they learn to play ancient Irish musical instruments, discover information about Irish history and traditions, and view demonstrations on ancient ways of life.Beverage TastingEach year there is a beverage tasting for adults. These include beer tastings, Irish whiskey tastings and as of 2011 the festival has included a mead tasting. In addition to the beverage tasting, Guinness is the official beer.

Celtic CaninesThe Irish Festival features an area presenting . Sunday ServicesOn Sunday the Irish Festival opens with a traditional Irish breakfast and an American breakfast. In addition, the Festival also offers multiple Sunday services, including a Catholic Mass in Irish Gaelic, a Catholic Mass in English, an Episcopal U2charist Service, and a Druid Service.Academy ClassesBefore the Irish Festival begins, people will have the opportunity to attend a variety of classes that focus on Irish music and culture.Celtic SportsThe Irish Festival hosts a variety of sporting events for attendees to participate in, including cornhole and a darts tournament. In addition the Festival presents the Highland Heavyweight Games. The games are a tribute to the ancient tradition when warring clans would battle with each other to prove their strength and agility. Attendees will watch as the teams compete in events such as the caber toss, stone put, weight throw, weight-over-bar, sheaf toss and hammer toss. A bagpipes showcase will also be available for viewing.Gathering of RedheadsRedheads will have the opportunity to be a part of the Midwest's Largest Gathering of Redheads. A group photograph will also be taken.Sand SculpturesStarting in 2003, The Irish Festival has featured large sand sculptures, showcasing Irish life and themes.

Awards
In 2006, the Festival was awarded an EXPY from Experience Columbus. The 2007 Festival was recognized by the International Festivals and Events Association with the Silver Grand Pinnacle Award, recognizing top events in the world. It was also selected by the American Bus Association as one of the top 100 events for 2009. The 2011 Irish Festival was honored with 7 International Festival and Events Association Haas & Wilkerson Pinnacle Awards. The Festival received gold in Best New Single Sponsor Program, Best TV Promotion Ad Spot and Best Merchandise. Silver in Best Social Media Site and Best T-shirt Design. Also the Festival took bronze in Best Individual Sponsorship Program and Best Single Magazine Display Ad.

References

External links
 Dublin Irish Festival

Folk festivals in the United States
Festivals in Ohio
Irish-American culture in Ohio
Tourist attractions in Franklin County, Ohio
Tourist attractions in Delaware County, Ohio
Dublin, Ohio
Celtic music festivals
Rock festivals in the United States